"Daughter" is a song by American rock band Pearl Jam, released in November 1993 as the second single from the band's second studio album, Vs. (1993). Although credited to all members of Pearl Jam, it features lyrics written by vocalist Eddie Vedder and music primarily written by guitarist Stone Gossard.

The song topped the US Album Rock and Modern Rock Billboard charts, spending a total of eight weeks at number one on the former chart. "Daughter" eventually peaked at number 33 on the Billboard Hot 100 Airplay chart, becoming the band's first top-40 single. Outside the United States, the song reached number 16 in Canada and is Pearl Jam's highest-charting single in Ireland, reaching number four and becoming their second top-ten single. "Daughter" also reached number 11 in New Zealand and number 18 in Australia and the United Kingdom.

The song was included on Pearl Jam's 2004 greatest hits album, rearviewmirror (Greatest Hits 1991–2003).

Origin and recording
Guitarist Stone Gossard used a Guild wide-body acoustic guitar to write the music for "Daughter". Bassist Jeff Ament plays upright bass on the song. Guitarist Mike McCready said, "That's one of the few solos I really had to sit down and work out." Drummer Dave Abbruzzese on his drumming on "Daughter":
When we were originally working on "Daughter", I did a lot more stuff on the toms. But when we went in to record it, Brendan [O'Brien] suggested trying something different, to just use the kick and snare. That was a trip, because we'd already been playing that song for half a year, and I was kind of used to what I was doing. At first I was like, "Well...okay..." so I set up a 26" kick, a snare, and an 18" floor tom, and we just used the room mic's and went for it. It actually brought out a whole new dimension of the song for me, and it felt really fresh to me to play it like that. Live, I kind of mix the two approaches together.

Lyrics
Eddie Vedder said about the song "Daughter":
"The child in that song obviously has a learning difficulty, and it's only in the last few years that they've actually been able to diagnose these learning disabilities, that before were looked at as misbehavior; as just outright rebelliousness, but no one knew what it was. These kids, because they seemed unable or reluctant to learn, they'd end up getting the shit beaten outta them. The song ends, you know, with this idea of the shades going down—so that the neighbors can't see what happens next. What hurts about shit like that is that it ends up defining people's lives. They have to live with that abuse for the rest of their lives. Good, creative people are just fucking destroyed."

Release and reception
While the "Daughter" single was released commercially to international markets in 1993, the commercial single was not released in the United States until June 27, 1995 and was only available as a more expensive import version beforehand. "Daughter" became the most successful song from Vs. at number one on the US Billboard Album Rock Tracks chart. The acoustic guitar-driven song remains one of Pearl Jam's preeminent songs, and helped solidify the group's success following the monumental Ten. It has remained an alternative rock radio staple. At the 1995 Grammy Awards, "Daughter" received a nomination for Best Rock Performance by a Duo or Group with Vocal.

Outside the United States, the single was released commercially in Australia, Austria, Japan, the Netherlands, the Philippines, and the United Kingdom. In Canada, the song reached the number 16 on the Canadian RPM Top Singles. In Europe, the song was a major success in Ireland, becoming Pearl Jam's highest-charting hit at number four. It was their second top 10 hit there, after "Jeremy". In the United Kingdom, the song reached number 18, while in the Netherlands, it reached number 46, and in Belgium, it reached number 39. The song was also successful in Australasia, peaking at number 11 in New Zealand and number 18 in Australia.

Chris True of Allmusic described the song as "sort-of classic Pearl Jam." He added, "It's earnest, it's got tension, and that nod to classic rock. It's Pearl Jam."

Live performances
"Daughter" was first performed live at Neil Young's 1992 Bridge School Benefit. It was also played at the band's December 31, 1992 concert at The Academy Theater in New York City, where Vedder introduced the song as "Brother". Both of these performances of the song featured different lyrics than the version that would ultimately wind up on Vs. "Daughter" is played at nearly every Pearl Jam show, almost always with an extension of the ending that could be an improvisation or a segment of another song. This extension is called a "Daughter tag". A different form of extension to the song was first introduced in the band's performance on Saturday Night Live in April 1994, just eight days after the death of Nirvana frontman and grunge pioneer Kurt Cobain. A tribute to Cobain, it is called "Daughter/Hey Hey, My My" by fans, since the extension is from the Neil Young song "Hey Hey, My My (Into the Black)", which Cobain's suicide note had quoted. Another popular tag of the song is the "It's Okay" tag, which includes a slow improvisation based on "It's Okay" by garage rock band Dead Moon.

Live performances of "Daughter" can be found on the "Dissident"/Live in Atlanta box set, the live album Live on Two Legs, various official bootlegs, the live album Live at Benaroya Hall, the live album Live in NYC 12/31/92, the Live at the Gorge 05/06 box set, and the live album Live at Lollapalooza 2007. Performances of the song are also included on the DVDs Touring Band 2000, Live at the Showbox, and Live at the Garden. The version of the song on Live at Lollapalooza 2007, onto which the band tagged Pink Floyd's "Another Brick in the Wall (Part 2)," features Vedder singing the lyrics "George Bush leave this world alone/George Bush find yourself another home". The band discovered that some of the Bush-related lyrics were excised from the AT&T webcast of Lollapalooza 2007, and questioned whether that constituted censorship. AT&T later apologized and blamed the censorship on contractor Davie Brown Entertainment. At the 2014 show in Milan, the band tagged the Disney song "Let It Go" to the end of the song's performance.

Track listings
All songs were written by Dave Abbruzzese, Jeff Ament, Stone Gossard, Mike McCready, and Eddie Vedder except where noted. "Blood" was recorded live on November 5, 1993, at the Empire Polo Fields in Indio, California. "Yellow Ledbetter" was recorded live on November 6, 1993, at the Mesa Amphitheatre in Mesa, Arizona.

CD (US, Australia, UK), 3-inch CD (Japan), 12-inch vinyl (UK), and cassette (Australia)
 "Daughter" – 3:54
 "Blood" (live) – 3:34
 "Yellow Ledbetter" (live) (Ament, McCready, Vedder) – 5:16

CD (Europe), 7-inch vinyl (UK), and cassette (UK)
 "Daughter" – 3:54
 "Blood" (live) – 3:34

7-inch vinyl (Philippines)
 "Daughter" – 3:53
 "Animal" – 2:46

Charts

Weekly charts

Year-end charts

Release history

See also
 List of Billboard Mainstream Rock number-one songs of the 1990s
 List of Billboard Modern Rock Tracks number ones of the 1990s

References

External links
 
 Lyrics at pearljam.com
 [ Review of "Daughter"] at Allmusic

1993 singles
1993 songs
Epic Records singles
Pearl Jam songs
Song recordings produced by Brendan O'Brien (record producer)
Song recordings produced by Dave Abbruzzese
Song recordings produced by Eddie Vedder
Song recordings produced by Jeff Ament
Song recordings produced by Mike McCready
Song recordings produced by Stone Gossard
Songs about child abuse
Songs about parenthood
Songs written by Dave Abbruzzese
Songs written by Eddie Vedder
Songs written by Jeff Ament
Songs written by Mike McCready
Songs written by Stone Gossard